Clarence Robinson was an American Negro league catcher who played in the 1940s.

Robinson played for the Baltimore Elite Giants in 1943. In 18 recorded games, he posted 11 hits with one home run in 48 plate appearances.

References

External links
 and Seamheads

Year of birth missing
Place of birth missing
Baltimore Elite Giants players
Baseball catchers